Érica Awano (born 12 December), is a Brazilian comics artist. She is the daughter of Japanese immigrants. Although her style is heavily influenced by Japanese manga and she has been called The best Brazilian manga artist, her works are considerably different from traditional manga, mainly because of their format.

After graduating from the University of São Paulo in Literature, Awano started her career in 1996 with illustrating Novas Aventuras de Megaman, a digest size comic book based on the Mega Man franchise. She then worked on a limited series based on Street Fighter Zero 3, written by Marcelo Cassaro and columns on how-to draw for magazines Anime Ex and Animax. She was the co-creator of the mascot of the magazine Anime Do.

She has illustrated role-playing games books for 3D&T and Tormenta, among others. Her most successful and recognized work is the comic series Holy Avenger (a spin-off of Tormenta), which lasted for 42 issues and spawned a handful of other projects, including other comics, an audio CD with professional actors playing the characters and an animated series.

References

External links
 Interview at Street Fighter RPG Brazil
 Example of Awano´s work
 Another example of her work
 Review of Holy Avenger
 Official Holy Avenger site
 https://web.archive.org/web/20151010025134/http://revistaogrito.ne10.uol.com.br/page/blog/2015/05/29/erica-awano-desenhista-de-holy-avenger-e-confirmada-na-comic-con-experience/

Brazilian people of Japanese descent
Women manga artists
Fantasy artists
Living people
Role-playing game artists
Year of birth missing (living people)
Brazilian female comics artists
Brazilian speculative fiction artists
Prêmio Angelo Agostini winners